Eastern Toll Road or Eastern Turnpike may refer to the following toll roads:

United States
 The Eastern Transportation Corridor, the tollway system in California, comprising portions of:
 State Route 133
 State Route 241
 State Route 261
 The Eastern Turnpike, the system in New Hampshire, comprising:
 Blue Star Turnpike
 Spaulding Turnpike
 The Eastern Turnpike System, the continuous tolled highway from Illinois to New Jersey, comprising (from west-to-east):
 Chicago Skyway
 Indiana Toll Road
 Ohio Turnpike
 Pennsylvania Turnpike
 Pennsylvania Extension of the New Jersey Turnpike

Others
 N17 East Toll Road in South Africa
 Ufa Eastern Toll Road, the road-construction project in Russia

See also 
 Central Turnpike